Fairchild Glacier is located in the U.S. state of Washington on Mount Fairchild and Mount Carrie in the Olympic Mountains of Olympic National Park. Like all the glaciers in Olympic National Park, Fairchild Glacier has been in a general retreat for over 100 years. The glacier is named for William R. Fairchild, who was a pilot that assisted scientific researchers in the region.

See also
List of glaciers in the United States

References

Glaciers of Clallam County, Washington
Glaciers of the Olympic Mountains
Glaciers of Washington (state)